Škoda 706 RTO is an urban bus produced by bus manufacturer Karosa and Škoda in Czechoslovakia between 1958 and 1972. It was succeeded by Karosa ŠM 11 in 1964.

Construction features 
706 RTO is built on frame of Škoda 706 trucks. Engine is placed in front next to driver, and rear axle is propelled by long driveshaft. On the right side are two doors.  The interior is furnished with leatherette seats.

Production and operation 
Serial production of the Škoda 706 RTO began in 1958, and continued until 1972.

From 1959 to 1986 the bus was also produced under licence in Poland by Jelcz factory as Jelcz 043 (nicknamed ″cucumber″, pol. ″ogórek″) .

Škoda 706 RTO is no longer operated by any public transport authorities, but many of them are operated as historical vehicles. The last Škoda 706 RTO used in public transport in Prague was retired in 1978.

Historical vehicles 
As many Škoda 706 RTO buses still exist, the following list is not complete.
Czech Republic
 ČSAP Nymburk (1xLUX, 1xKAR, 1×modified convertible, 1×passenger trailer Karosa NO 80)
 ČSAD buses Plzeň (2×KAR)
 Transport Company of the České Budějovice (bus no. 128 version MTZ)
 Transport Company towns Most and Litvínov (bus reg. No. 150 version MEX)
 DP Ostrava (bus reg. No. 247 KAR version)
 DP Pardubice (bus reg. No. 28 version MTZ)
 Nová Bystřice (perhaps it still run on regular routes JH Bus Ltd.)
 DS Zlín - Otrokovice (bus reg. No. 2 version MTZ, SPZ 3Z6 6930, year 1959)
 Technical Museum in Brno (bus reg. No. 202 version MTZ, year 1966)
 Plzeň Transport Company (bus reg. No. 51 version MTZ)
 Busline (1 × 53-84 LIA MTZ license plates, license plate KAR 3L3 8000, year 1964)
 Transport company of Karlovy Vary (1 × LUX, SPZ SOA 13–88, year 1961)
 TS Příbram (1 × KAR, SPZ PB 34–40)
 BBG Eberswalde (1 × KAR, SPZ BAR B109H, year 1963)
 Bus Jihotrans (1 × LUX, SPZ CBA 19–49, year 1965)
 Tourbus (1xLUX, SPZ BSC 74–95, year 1969)
 PROBO BUS (1×LUX, license plate 11V 2499, year 1968)
 ZDAR (1 × KAR)
 P-transport (1×KAR, license plate NAA 55–33, year 1964)
 Magic Bus (LUX, license plate 14V 0142)

Slovakia:
 DP Bratislava (bus reg. No. 236 version MTZ)
 SAD Trnava (1 × LUX, SPZ TT-H040)
 ŠKODA - BUS club Plzeň (version LUX year 1961 version TRST, mobile transfusion station, year 1964)
 Nitra (LUX version, the car is garaged in the Slovak Agricultural Museum, belonging to private individuals)
 ANVI TRADE s.r.o. (version LUX)

See also 

 List of buses

Buses
Buses manufactured by Karosa
Buses of the Czech Republic
Vehicles introduced in 1958